Gyaritus quadridentatus is a species of beetle in the family Cerambycidae. It was described by Maurice Pic in 1936. It is known from Vietnam.

References

Gyaritini
Beetles described in 1936